Dar Al Basha is a historical landmark and a palace that is located in the old city of Marrakesh, Morocco.

History 
Dar Al Barsha history construction date goes back to 1910 as it was the residence of Tohami El Galaoui, which Sultan Moulay Yosef granted the title of "Basha Marakesh" year 1912. Among the guests who visited the Dar were Colette Maurice Ravel, Charli Chaplin, Josephine Baker, Winston Churchill and others.

Dar Al Basha Museum 
The palace was renovated by the Moroccan National Music Foundation and converted into the museum known as Dar Al Basha, which was inaugurated by Mohammed the Sixth on July 9, 2017.

The museum holds temporary exhibitions highlighting different aspects of Moroccan culture.

Architectural Engineering 
Dar Al Basha is considered a beautiful example of Moorish architecture. As it features a fountain, orange trees in the courtyard, traditional seating areas and a traditional bathroom.

Many of the original interior design features have been preserved and restored, including carved and painted wooden doors, black and white marble floors, ceilings covered with colorful azulejo mosaics, and columns painted with colorful natural pigments, such as indigo, saffron, poppy.

Coffee 
There is a place to drink coffee in the museum's courtyard, which was also created to revive the modern art in the palace.

References 

Palaces in Morocco
Marrakesh